Zipoetopsis is a genus of beetles in the family Cerambycidae, containing the following species:

 Zipoetopsis dissimilis Galileo & Martins, 1995
 Zipoetopsis unicolor Breuning, 1950

References

Agapanthiini